Wojciech Stanisław Bartnik (born 2 December 1967 in Olesnica) is a former  southpaw boxer from Poland, who won a Light Heavyweight Bronze medal at the 1992 Summer Olympics.

Amateur career
1992 – Bronze Medal (Light Heavyweight) at the Barcelona Olympic Games
Defeated Alex Gonzales (Puerto Rico) points
Defeated Mohammed Benguesmia (Algeria) points
Defeated Angel Espinosa (Cuba) points
Lost to Torsten May (Germany) points
1996 – Bronze Medal (Heavyweight) at European Amateur Boxing Championships in Vejle, Denmark
Defeated Gitas Juskevicius (Lithuania) points
Defeated Alexey Chudinov (Russia) retired
Lost to Luan Krasniqi (Germany) points
1996 – Represented Poland (Heavyweight) at the Atlanta Olympic Games
Defeated Larha Singh (India) points
Lost to Georgi Kandelaki (Georgia) points
2000 – Represented Poland (Heavyweight) at the Sydney Olympic Games
Lost to Michael Bennett (United States) points

Professional career
Bartnik began his professional career in 2001 and had limited success.  His biggest fight was a points loss to Albert Sosnowski in 2004.  Wojciech Bartnik's stats: 29 fights, 24 wins (9 by KO), 4 losses, 1 draw.

External links
 
 sports-reference

1967 births
Light-heavyweight boxers
Heavyweight boxers
Boxers at the 1992 Summer Olympics
Boxers at the 1996 Summer Olympics
Boxers at the 2000 Summer Olympics
Olympic boxers of Poland
Olympic bronze medalists for Poland
Living people
Olympic medalists in boxing
Medalists at the 1992 Summer Olympics
People from Oleśnica
Sportspeople from Lower Silesian Voivodeship
Polish male boxers